The Bicentenary Celebration match was a 50-over exhibition cricket match played on 5 July 2014 at Lord's Cricket Ground, London, to mark the 200th anniversary of the ground, which was first used in 1814 and is considered the "home of cricket". The match was contested by the Marylebone Cricket Club (MCC), for whom Lord's is their home ground, and a Rest of the World team. The MCC team won the match by seven wickets, with Aaron Finch being named man of the match for his score of 181*.

A previous 200th anniversary celebration match took place at Lord's in 1987, also between MCC and the Rest of the World, on the occasion of the bicentenary of Marylebone Cricket Club.

Squads

Match

Summary
Rest of the World captain Shane Warne won the toss and elected to bat. Adam Gilchrist and Virender Sehwag gave the ROW a quick start. The MCC's Pakistani bowler Umar Gul suffered a recurrence of a right knee injury, which meant he only bowled two overs before leaving the field. Pakistan spinner Saeed Ajmal was introduced during the power play and he struck immediately, removing Gilchrist, Kevin Pietersen, Tamim Iqbal and Shahid Afridi. However, this was then followed by a century stand between Yuvraj Singh and Paul Collingwood. Singh eventually scored a century as his late assault took the total to 293. Warne suffered a broken hand from the bowling of Brett Lee. Warne was replaced in the field by South African all-rounder Shaun Pollock. The MCC started well with both Sachin Tendulkar and Aaron Finch batting positively. Sri Lankan bowler Muttiah Muralitharan removed Tendulkar before Collingwood was able to dismiss Brian Lara and Rahul Dravid off consecutive deliveries. Finch along with Shivnarine Chanderpaul then took MCC home with Finch scoring 181 not out.

Details

Controversy
During commentary, former England cricketer Andrew Strauss described Kevin Pietersen as "a cunt" in what he believed to be an off-air conversation. While the comment did not go out on Sky Sports, it was broadcast to overseas viewers. Strauss later said "I apologise unreservedly, particularly to Kevin Pietersen. I am mortified and profusely sorry."

References

2014 in English cricket
International cricket competitions in 2014
Marylebone Cricket Club
Cricket in London
Limited overs cricket matches
Lord's
2014 sports events in London
July 2014 sports events in Europe
2010s in the City of Westminster